Imerina mabillalis is a species of snout moth in the genus Imerina. It was described by Ragonot in 1891. It is found on Madagascar.

References

Moths described in 1891
Pyralinae
Taxa named by Émile Louis Ragonot